The PAL region is a television publication territory that covers most of Europe and Africa, alongside parts of Asia, South America and Oceania. It is named PAL because of the PAL (Phase Alternating Line) television standard traditionally used in some of those regions, as opposed to the NTSC standard traditionally used in Japan and most of North America.

More recently, as most countries have stopped using the PAL standard entirely in favor of newer digital standards such as DVB, the term "PAL region" in video gaming means the list of regions it had covered in the past.

List

Below are countries and territories that used or once used the PAL system. Many of these have converted or are converting PAL to DVB-T (most countries), DVB-T2 (most countries), DTMB (China, Hong Kong and Macau) or ISDB (Sri Lanka, Maldives, Botswana and part of South America).

PAL B, D, G, H, K or I

 (used SECAM)

 (DVB-T introduction in assessment)

 (Digital broadcast using DTMB)

 (see New Zealand)

 (migrated from SECAM 1990–1992)

 (UHF only)

 (Analogue shutoff scheduled to 2 November 2022; simulcasted in DVB-T since 2008 until 2012, been changed to DVB-T2 2012 forward, and the government scheduled to give-away free 7 million STB DVB-T2 in April 2014)
(DVB-T introduction in assessment)
 (DVB-T introduction in assessment)
 (DVB-T introduction in assessment)

 (Once experimented in PAL-M)
 (Using PAL for Lebanese channels. Channels from Europe or even from USA are not broadcast analogue)

 (PAL-I, DTMB introduced since 15 July 2008)

 (DVB-T2 digital launched. Analogue switch-off was completed by end-October 2019)

 (see Australia)
 (used SECAM until 1990s)
 (DVB-T introduction in assessment)

 (DVB-T introduction in assessment)

 (Two PAL-I analogue TV services operated by BFBS)

 (along with SECAM)

 (PAL broadcast to be abandoned. Analog shutoff scheduled for 15 June 2015. Simulcast in DVB-T)

 (DVB-T introduction)

PAL-M 
  (H264 video over ISDB-T, at 480i@60 Hz (SD) or 1080i@60 Hz (HD), simulcast with digital format in ISDB-Tb, also called SBTVD), an update to ISDB-T, started in December 2007. PAL broadcasting in its final stages of abandonment, the complete shut-down is scheduled to 2023.

PAL-N 
  (H264 video over ISDB-T, at 480i/576i@50/60 Hz (SD) or 1080i@50/60 Hz (HD), simulcast with digital format in ISDB-Tb, also called SBTVD), an update to ISDB-T, started in August 28, 2008. PAL broadcasting in its final stages of abandonment, the complete shut-down is scheduled to 2023.
  (Simulcast in ISDB-T)
  (Simulcast in ISDB-T)

Countries and territories that have ceased using PAL 
The following countries no longer use PAL for terrestrial broadcasts, and are in process of converting from PAL (cable) to DVB-T or ISDB-T.

60 Hz operation
During the mid-1990s, the practice of modifying consoles such as the Super NES and Mega Drive to allow 60 Hz operation became somewhat common among PAL gamers, due to the rise in NTSC/60 Hz capable PAL TVs and the relatively simple nature of the modifications. Beginning with the Amiga CD32, which introduced more powerful hardware, developers had the ability to output at full PAL resolution without borders or stretching, although games still typically ran slower and all ran at 50 Hz. Beginning with the Dreamcast and continuing through the sixth generation of consoles, developers began including PAL60 modes in their games. Games that run at PAL60 are produced with the same color encoding system as 50 Hz PAL signals, but with the NTSC resolution and field rate of 60 Hz, providing an identical gaming experience to their NTSC counterparts, however some games, such as Tekken 4 and Tekken 5, will use the NTSC color mode when in 60 Hz mode; these games will appear in black and white on PAL-only televisions. The Brazilian PAL-M the standard always operates at 60 Hz, but due bandwidth size, the chroma carrier frequency differs between PAL-M and European PAL, so, even being both PAL color systems, the PAL-60 it's incompatible with PAL-M TV sets.

Criticism of PAL region video games
Games ported to PAL have historically been known for having game speed and frame rates inferior to their NTSC counterparts. Since the NTSC standard is 60 fields/30 frames per second but PAL is 50 fields/25 frames per second, games were typically slowed by approximately 16.7% in order to avoid timing problems or unfeasible code changes. Full motion video rendered and encoded at 30 frames per second by the Japanese/US (NTSC) developers was often down-sampled to 25 frames per second or considered to be 50 frames per second video for PAL release—usually by means of 3:2 pull-down, resulting in motion judder. In addition to this, PAL's increased resolution was not utilised during conversion, creating a pseudo letterbox effect with borders top and bottom, which looks similar to a 14:9 letterbox, and leaving the graphics with a slightly squashed look due to an incorrect aspect ratio caused by the borders. This was prevalent in previous generations (especially during the 8-bit and 16-bit era, when 2D graphics were the norm at that time). The gameplay of many games with an emphasis on speed, such as the original Sonic the Hedgehog for the Sega Genesis/Mega Drive, suffered in their PAL incarnations.

Despite the possibility and popularity of 60 Hz PAL games, many high-profile games, particularly for the PlayStation 2 console, were released in 50 Hz-only versions. Square Enix have long been criticised by PAL gamers for their poor PAL conversions. Final Fantasy X, for example, runs in 50 Hz mode only, meaning it runs 16.7% slower than the NTSC release and features top and bottom borders; while this practice was common in previous generations, it was considered inexcusable by contemporary consumers at the time of release. In contrast, the Dreamcast was the first system to feature PAL60, and the overwhelming majority of PAL games offered 50 and 60 Hz modes with no slow speeds. The PAL GameCube also offered 60 Hz on almost every title released. The Xbox featured a system-wide PAL60 option in the Dashboard, with almost every game supporting PAL60. Seventh generation PAL consoles Xbox 360, PlayStation 3 and Wii also feature system-wide 60 Hz support.

As of the eighth generation, consoles such as the Wii U, PlayStation 4, Xbox One and Nintendo Switch have all games solely in 60 Hz, with 50 Hz only being used for video playback and, in the Wii U's case, backwards compatibility with Wii and Virtual Console games.

These problems do not occur in the PAL-M standard used in Brazil, since it is mostly based on the NTSC standard (with its frame rate operating at around 30 frames-per-second) except for the colour subcarrier, which is similar to that of PAL/625/25.

See also
 PAL
 NTSC
 Advanced Television Systems Committee standards
 SECAM
 Regional lockout

References

Video formats
Video game culture